Margarita “Mita” Cuaron focuses on Los Angeles culture and activism in her art. She was inspired by La Virgen de Guadalupe through which she demonstrates light and rebirth when she paints. In her artwork “Virgen de Guadalupe Baby” from 1992, Cuaron demonstrates that never stays static. In her pieces, La Virgen is the cycle of life. She depicts a baby surrounded by the womb, which is shaped by clouds and La Virgen's typical sunlight and green garments. Within the child's clasped hands is a light red heart. The child is sheltered by the womb, which offers protection from the outside world.

References 

Year of birth missing (living people)
Living people
Artists from Los Angeles